Ellon Academy is a secondary comprehensive school in the Aberdeenshire town of Ellon. In August 2015, the school moved to its new purpose-built campus to the south of the town.

History
Founded as Ellon Public School, the building was opened on 22 May 1876. It was responsible for the education of both primary and secondary students; in 1962 the two were split into separate sites. Ellon Public School was overseen by headmaster William Cooper. It had 6 classrooms, male and female. During the early years, the overcrowding problem, that has haunted the school for years, started to become clear, and it was decided that a second storey would be built. During the 24-year wait for the construction to begin, Ellon Public School became Ellon Secondary School. The second floor was completed in 1911.

It turned out to be only a temporary cure for the growing problem of congestion. With more pupils coming in every year, the school was facing a crisis. In the late 1930s, the famous bell tower, and headmaster's office, were destroyed to make room for a second extension. In 1979, a second building was constructed.

In 2005, the Education and Recreation department of Aberdeenshire Council began investigating the consolidation of the school at a single site. In September 2009, the Scottish Government announced that the academy would be one of fourteen secondary schools in Scotland to be rebuilt as part of a £1.25 billion programme.

In 2015, the school was relocated to the new purpose-built Ellon Academy Community Campus on Kelly Pearl Way to the south of the town. The old building was demolished.

Today
The school has an estimated 1,068 pupils and a teaching staff of 89 FTE. The school is headed by Rector Pauline Buchan, who succeeded Tim McKay in 2016.

Ellon Academy won the Scottish Executive Education Award in 2002 in the category "Schools for All".

Ellon Academy was made a case point during a First Minister's Questions, where it was criticized for its split campus layout and general disrepair. This prompted a visitation from Labour MSPs, and later from STV and BBC television crews.

In November 2008, Ellon Academy was awarded the Eco-Schools Green Flag, the organisation's highest award, which accredits schools for their actions helping the environment. In January 2011, Ellon Academy was awarded a second Green Flag.

In June 2010, Ellon Academy was shortlisted in the Global Citizenship Award category of the 2010 Scottish Education Awards.

On 14 September 2012, Ellon Academy broke the world record for the largest "Superman" dance. This was part of the recent 80's themed "Party In the Park" school fundraiser. Ellon academy also holds the world record for the longest sandcastle by Peter Stewart

On 10 June 2013, Head Librarian, Jan Murdoch, was named Educational Supporter of the Year 2013 at the Scottish Education Awards in Glasgow.

Notable former pupils 
 Tom Patey (20 February 1932 — 25 May 1970) climber, mountaineer and writer
 Evelyn Glennie (born 19 July 1965) virtuosa percussionist
 Yvie Burnett (born 1968) vocal coach The X-Factor Britain's Got Talent
 Johanna Basford (born 1983) illustrator, artist and business woman. OBE.

References

External links

Ellon Academy's page on Education Scotland's ParentZone

Secondary schools in Aberdeenshire
Educational institutions established in 1876
1876 establishments in Scotland
Ellon, Aberdeenshire